is a 2016-2017 Japanese tokusatsu web series, serving as a spin-off/prequel of the 2016 Ultra Series series, Ultraman Orb. The series is set to be exclusively released on Amazon Video in Japan starting from December 26, 2016 and is planned to be released worldwide, with English and German subtitles available for international viewers.

Episodes



Notes

References

External links
Episode Lists on Ultraman Orb: The Origin Saga

Orb: The Origin Saga